William George Peter Glaze (17 September 1917 – 20 February 1983) was an English comedian born in London. He appeared in Crackerjack! with Eamonn Andrews and Leslie Crowther in the 1960s, and with Michael Aspel, Don Maclean and Bernie Clifton in the 1970s. In Crackerjack! sketches, he usually played a pompous or middle-class character, who would always get exasperated with his partner Don Maclean during the course of the sketch. Maclean would then give an alliterative reply, such as "Don't get your knickers in a knot" or "Don't get your tights in a twist". He regularly uttered the expression "D'oh!", originated by James Finlayson in Laurel and Hardy films, long before it became associated with cartoon character Homer Simpson. He was also on the panel of the long-running radio panel game Twenty Questions, along with Joy Adamson, Anona Winn and Norman Hackforth.

Glaze was the son of an actor-manager and began his career in entertainment as a comedian at the Windmill Theatre in 1946. He was the Crazy Gang's understudy and appeared in the 1981 musical Underneath the Arches, with Roy Hudd and Christopher Timothy as Flanagan and Allen; he assisted Hudd in a re-creation of one of the Gang's routines for a televised Royal Variety Performance in 1982. He also appeared in Whack-O! (1958); as the villainous City Administrator in the Doctor Who serial The Sensorites (1964); and in The Sweeney episode "Big Spender" (1975) as Joe Spratt. Glaze also played the actor supplying the farm animal noises in the Hancock episode "The Bowmans" (1961).

References

External links

 Retrospective at Chortle.

1917 births
1983 deaths
English male comedians
English male television actors
Male actors from London
20th-century English male actors
20th-century English comedians